Raymond Renard (9 March 1925 – 19 March 2020) was a Belgian writer and linguist who earned a doctorate in philosophy from the Université libre de Bruxelles in 1954.

Publications
Arthur Cantillon. Sa vie, son œuvre (1958)
Maurice Maeterlinck et l'Italie. Renommée et influence (1959)
Points de Départ... Essais de Morale (1960)
L'enseignement des langues vivantes par la méthode audio-visuelle et structuro globale de St-Cloud-Zagreb (1965)
Sépharad. Le monde et la langue judéo-espagnole des Séphardim (1966)
Introduction à la méthode verbo-tonale de correction phonétique (1971)
Initiation phonétique à l'usage des professeurs de langues (1975)
La méthodologie SGAV d'enseignement des langues : une problématique d'apprentissage de la parole (1976)
Foreign language teaching with an integrated methodology (1976)
De structureel-globale audio-visuele methode (1976)
Éléments de phonétique (1982)
Mémento de phonétique à l'usage des professeurs de langues et des orthophonistes (1983)
Variations sur la problématique SGAV, Essais de didactique des langues (1993)
Apprentissage d'une langue étrangère/seconde. 2. La phonétique verbo-tonale (2002)
Structuro-global et verbo-tonal : Variations 1962-2010, Essais de didactique des langues (2010)
Pour une laïcité universalisable (2014)

References

1925 births
2020 deaths
Belgian writers